Dragan Jakovljević (born 23 February 1962) is a Bosnian Serb former footballer who played as a forward for FK Sarajevo, Nantes, Royal Antwerp as well as the SFR Yugoslavia national team.

Club career
Jakovljević was an important member of the memorable Sarajevo squad that won the 1984–85 Yugoslav First League and later became a Cup Winners Cup runner-up medal winner with Antwerp after losing the 1993 Final to Parma at Wembley Stadium.

International career
He made his debut for Yugoslavia in a December 1987 European Championship qualification match away against Turkey and has earned a total of 8 caps, scoring 3 goals. Jakovljević was included by Yugoslavia national football team to UEFA Euro 1992 as a replacement player to Darko Pančev, who renounced in 24 May by claiming physical reasons, although this statement was believed for just a few people in Belgrade, who saw political views as the true cause of the withdrawal of the Macedonian forward. Jakovljević, however, could never play in the tournament, as the national team would be suspended one week later due to the Yugoslav Wars.

His final international was an October 1989 FIFA World Cup qualification match against Norway, although he later played an unofficial match against ACF Fiorentina in May 1992, as a substitute man to Dejan Petković. The Italian club did won by 2-1, in the last match of the old Yugoslavia team before the Euro ban and before the country being reduced to Serbia and Montenegro federation.

International goals
''Scores and results table. Yugoslavia's goal tally first:

Honours
Sarajevo
 Yugoslav First League: 1984-85
Royal Antwerp
 Belgian Cup: 1991-92
 UEFA Cup Winners' Cup: 1992-93 (runners-up)

References

External links
 
 
 

1962 births
Living people
People from Konjic
Serbs of Bosnia and Herzegovina
Association football midfielders
Yugoslav footballers
Yugoslavia international footballers
Bosnia and Herzegovina footballers
FK Igman Konjic players
FK Sarajevo players
FC Nantes players
Royal Antwerp F.C. players
Yugoslav Second League players
Yugoslav First League players
Ligue 1 players
Belgian Pro League players
Yugoslav expatriate footballers
Expatriate footballers in France
Yugoslav expatriate sportspeople in France
Yugoslav expatriate sportspeople in Belgium
Expatriate footballers in Belgium
Bosnia and Herzegovina expatriate footballers
Bosnia and Herzegovina expatriate sportspeople in Belgium